Malcolm X, also known as Malcolm X: His Own Story As It Really Happened, is a 1972 American documentary film directed by Arnold Perl. It is based on the 1965 book The Autobiography of Malcolm X.

Production
Marvin Worth and Perl started working on Malcolm X in 1969, four years after the human rights activist's assassination. The pair initially intended for the film to be a drama, but in the end they made a documentary when some people close to Malcolm X refused to talk to them. Worth recalled in 1993, "I mostly went for the public figure, rather than the private man. I aimed for showing the evolution of the man and what he had to say. I wanted to do it with the public speeches." 

Archival footage, newsreels and excerpts of speeches given by Malcolm were utilized in the film.

Betty Shabazz, Malcolm X's widow, served as a consultant to the film-makers. She was so pleased with the resulting film, she took her six daughters—who ranged in age from six to thirteen—to see it. Afterwards, one of them asked, "Daddy was everything to you, wasn't he?"

Reception
According to the Los Angeles Times, Malcolm X garnered "enthusiastic reviews". Time wrote:

For Warner Bros. to make a documentary about Malcolm X seems about as likely as for the D.A.R. to sponsor the Peking Ballet. That the film should come from such a source is the first surprise. The second is that it is good—a fair forum for Malcolm's fundamental ideas and an exceptional visual chronicle of how those ideas took shape.

In his review for The New York Times, Howard Thompson described it as "a generally rounded, often fascinating movie". Thompson also wrote that the film was "surprisingly balanced".

Jay Carr wrote in The Boston Globe in 1993 that Malcolm X was "essential viewing". William Hageman wrote in the Chicago Tribune in 2011 that the documentary "does a better job of capturing the times" than Spike Lee's 1992 Malcolm X.

Accolades
The film was nominated for an Academy Award for Best Documentary Feature.

Home media
Malcolm X was released on DVD in 2005 as bonus material with the two-disc special edition of Lee's film. In 2012, it was issued on Blu-ray Disc as part of the Blu-ray 20th-anniversary edition of Lee's film.

See also
 Civil rights movement in popular culture
 King: A Filmed Record... Montgomery to Memphis - 1970 Oscar-nominated documentary this time focusing on Martin Luther King Jr.
 I Am Not Your Negro - 2016 Oscar-nominated film essay documentary based on James Baldwin's unfinished memoir

References

External links

Official trailer

1972 films
1972 documentary films
1972 directorial debut films
American documentary films
American black-and-white films
Films about Malcolm X
Warner Bros. films
1970s English-language films
1970s American films
Collage film